Pongola (also known in Zulu as uPhongolo) is a town on the north bank of the Phongolo River, in a fertile valley on the N2, near the Lubombo Mountains, in the valleys of Zululand, easily accessible to the Swaziland border posts. It was part of the Transvaal panhandle between the Phongolo (Natal) and Swaziland (now Eswatini) until 1994, when it was transferred to KwaZulu-Natal.

It is a unique and tranquil subtropical environment. It has more than 50 km2 of sugarcane and subtropical fruit plantations surrounding it. During the Depression years of the 1930s, drastic irrigation systems were started in Pongola for sugar  cane farms. The town thrived as a result of the canal system and a sugar mill that was built. Today it is part of the uPhongolo Local Municipality.

Pongolapoort Dam and Pongola Game Reserve is to the east. It is the only dam in South Africa where you can catch African tigerfish (family Alestidæ).

The uPhongolo Local Municipality is one of five local municipalities located within the area of the Zululand District Municipality. The municipality is governed by the ANC Council consisting of 22 Councillors and an executive committee and Hon. Cllr Winile Nhlabathi is the Mayor. The administrative functions are performed by the Municipal Manager and a team of managers. Among other schools, there are Pongola Akademie, Dingukwazi Senior Secondary School and Langa High School. Dingukwazi High Currently led by principal Dr S.G Msane and Bambanani led by Principal Mr M. Ntshangase are leading schools in Pongola in terms of enrolment so as Matric pass rates.

Pongola is surrounded by hunting lodges and several have even the Big Five. Some farms specialize in biltong hunting and others concentrate on trophy hunting.

Richard Antoine Rouillard, born in the Phoenix district of Mauritius in 1873, was the driving force behind the agricultural and economic prosperity of the Louwsburg and Magut districts. The pioneering spirit which opened up the interior of South Africa came in a variety of guises.

Pongola is home to Tugam Game Farm, uPhongolo's oldest game reserve.

References

External links
 Pongola Tourism
 Pongola Game Reserve
 Statistics at Stats SA

Populated places in the uPhongolo Local Municipality